Dan or Daniel Donovan may refer to:

Dan Donovan (keyboardist) (born 1962), keyboardist for Big Audio Dynamite and Dreadzone
Dan Donovan (guitarist) (born 1960), singer/songwriter, guitarist for Tribe of Dan
Dan Donovan (politician) (born 1956), Former U.S. Congressman
Daniel Donovan (doctor) (died 1880), author and doctor of medicine in West Cork, Ireland
Daniel Donovan (theologian) (born 1937), Canadian theologian, catholic priest and art collector